Sarokhipura is a village in Panchayat Mukutpura of Jaitpur Kalan Block at Bah Tehsil of Agra, Uttar Pradesh, India India. It is situated on Fatehabad road 85 km from Agra City. This village mainly has Rajput Bhadauria and Brahmin communities.

History
During February 1313, present residents of Sarokhipura migrated from Koshad village of Bhadawar estate
Koshad was treasury of Bhadawar Estate. Shri Hodal Shah Rao founded Koshad village as part of the Bhadawar State. During 1692, descendants of Shri Himmat Singh Bhadauria settled in Kharik village, eldest son of Shri Himmat Singh Bhadauria, Kallu Singh Bhadauria, got Shirkhipur village to commemorate victory over Gohad in 1708.  Shri Kallu Singh Bhadauria was part of Maharajadhiraj Maharaj Mahendra Gopal Singh troops which taken over the Gohad Fort defeating Rana Bhim Singh.  Sarokihipura was also called "Gohlaari"  here is a famous "talaiya"

Geography
Sarokihipura has the river Chambal at one side and the river Yamuna on the other. The soil here is very fertile and main crops are wheat, bajra, channa and mustard.

Transport to Sarokhipura
Follow the Fatehabad road from Agra to Bah (70 km) and then further to Jaitpur(10 km)and from Jaitpur intersection go straight to Etawah side, after 3 km small village on your right is Sarokhipura.

Education
The village has a government funded Primary School, which was established in the 2004 This Co-Educational Hindi medium school is managed by State Department of Education. For Poor students Scholarships are available at this school

Read in Hindi : सरोखिपुरा

References 

Villages in Agra district

bpy:বাহ